Rani Velu Nachiyar (3 January 1730 – 25 December 1796) was a queen of Sivaganga estate from  1780–1790. She was the first Indian queen to wage war with the East India Company in India. She is known by Tamils as Veeramangai ("brave woman"). With the support of Hyder Ali's army, feudal lords, the Maruthu Brothers, Dalit commanders, and Thandavarayan Pillai, she fought the East India company.

Life

Velu Nachiyar was the princess of Ramanathapuram and the only child of King Chellamuthu Vijayaragunatha Sethupathy and Queen Sakandhimuthathal of the Ramnad kingdom.
Nachiyar was trained in many methods of combat, including war match weapons usage, martial arts like Valari, Silambam, horse riding, and archery. She was a scholar in many languages and was proficient in languages like French, English and Urdu. She married the king of Sivagangai, with whom she had a daughter. 

When her husband, Muthu Vaduganatha Periyavudaya Thevar was killed in a battle with EIC soldiers in 1780 at KalaiyarKoil, she was drawn into the conflict. Velu Nachiyar ran away from Sivagangai as a fugitive and sought the help of Hyder Ali. Hyder Ali helped her with 5,000 soldiers and gunpowder weapons. Initially Hyder Ali refused but later agreed to help her with soldiers, arms and training. Velu Nachiyar sought the help of rich merchants as well. After eight years of planning along with support of many feudal lords, Tipu Sultan, Marudhu brothers and Thandavarayan Pillai she fought against the British East India Company.

When Velu Nachiyar found the place where the EIC stored some their ammunition, Her commander Kuyili  made a suicide attack on the ammunition depot,she ran into the ammunition godown, setting herself on fire  blowing it up. 
Nachiyar reinherited the kingdom of her husband, and ruled it for ten more years. 

In 1790, she was succeeded by her daughter Vellacci. She granted powers to her daughter with the Marudu brothers to help with the administration of the kingdom. Velu Nachiyar died a few years later, on 25 December 1796.

Popular culture
On 31 December 2008, a commemorative postage stamp in her name was released.
OVM Dance Academy of Chennai presenting "VELU NACHIYAR" a Grand Dance Ballet on Sivaganga Queen.
Professor A.L.I., a Tamil-American hip-hop artist, released a song dedicated to Velu Nachiyar entitled "Our Queen" as part of his Tamilmatic album in 2016.
On 21 August 2017, a grand dance ballet was conducted in Naradha Gana Sabha in Chennai depicting the life history of the queen Velu Nachiyar. The play was directed by Sriram Sharma, who researched on the Queen's life history for almost a decade.

See also
 Indian independence activists
 Indian independence movement
 Kuyili
 Puli Thevar
 Vellore mutiny of 1806

References

External link

1730 births
1796 deaths
Indian female royalty
Indian independence activists from Tamil Nadu
Indian women in war
Tamil monarchs
Indian revolutionaries
Indian independence movement
People from Sivaganga district
Women in 18th-century warfare
18th-century women rulers
18th-century Indian women
18th-century Indian people